A microwave antenna is a physical transmission device used to broadcast microwave transmissions between two or more locations. In addition to broadcasting, antennas are also used in radar, radio astronomy and electronic warfare.

Microwave frequency bands

Uses

 One-way (e.g. television broadcasting) and two-way telecommunication using communications satellites
 Terrestrial microwave relay links in telecommunications networks including backbone or backhaul carriers in cellular networks linking BTS-BSC and BSC-MSC.
 Radar
 Radio astronomy
 Communications intelligence
 Electronic warfare

Antenna types

Reflector antennas

A parabolic antenna is an antenna that uses a parabolic reflector, a curved surface with the cross-sectional shape of a parabola, to direct the radio waves. These devices range anywhere from 6" to more than 12' diameter depending on application and use.

Horn antennas
A horn antenna or microwave horn is an antenna that consists of a flaring metal waveguide shaped like a horn to direct radio waves in a beam.  Horns are widely used as antennas at UHF and microwave frequencies, above 300 MHz.

Lens antennas
A lens antenna uses a lens to direct or collect microwave radiation.

Array antennas
An array antenna is a high gain antenna consisting of an array of smaller antenna elements.

Leaky wave antenna
A leaky wave antenna uses a leaking transmission line to obtain radiation.

References

Telecommunications equipment
Radio frequency antenna types